Delphiniobium is a genus of true bugs belonging to the family Aphididae.

The species of this genus are found in Europe.

Species:
 Delphiniobium aconitifoliae Zhang, Guangxue & Qiao, 2000

References

Aphididae